Amaurobius scopolii is a species of spider in the family Amaurobiidae, found in Southern Europe.

References

scopolii
Spiders of Europe
Spiders described in 1871